The England national football team represents the country of England in international association football. It is fielded by The Football Association, the governing body of football in England, and competes as a member of the Union of European Football Associations (UEFA), which encompasses the countries of Europe. England competed in the first official international football match on 30 November 1872, a 0–0 draw with Scotland at Hamilton Crescent.

England have competed in numerous competitions, and all players who have played in only one match, either as a member of the starting eleven or as a substitute, are listed below. Each player's details include his usual playing position while with the team, the number of caps earned and goals scored in all international matches, and details of the first and most recent matches played in. The names are initially ordered by date of debut, and then by alphabetical order. All statistics are correct up to and including the match played on 11 June 2022.

Key

Players

See also
List of England international footballers, covering players with ten or more caps
List of England international footballers (4–9 caps)
List of England international footballers (2–3 caps)

References

 
Association football player non-biographical articles